Bonchester may refer to:

Bonchester Bridge, hamlet in the Scottish Borders area of Scotland
Bonchester cheese, soft Scottish cheese, named after the above hamlet